Mont Billiat is a mountain of Haute-Savoie, France. It lies in the Chablais Alps range.

References

Mountains of the Alps
Mountains of Haute-Savoie